Amelia Wood (née Amelia Wershoven, Amelia Bert; December 11, 1930 – June 7, 2013) was an American track and field athlete who competed in throwing events, specializing in the javelin throw. She was a Pan American Games champion and a 1956 Olympian.

She was highly successful at national level, winning seven American titles, indoors and out, and two javelin national titles. She was also the highest ranked American in shot put and discus at the 1950 AAU Championships, finishing behind Poland's Frances Kaszubski who was present as a foreign competitor. Wood had much longevity, finishing in the top five in the national shot put competition every year from 1949 to 1954 and ranking in the top two American javelin throwers each season from 1950 to 1959.

Internationally, Wood had most of her success at the Pan American Games javelin competition. She returned for the following two editions and reached the podium both times, taking bronze medals in 1955 and 1959. She also represented the United States in the shot put at the 1951 meet, placing fifth. She made one appearance at the Olympic Games, as part of America's three-woman javelin team at the 1956 Summer Olympics, where she was 14th in the final behind her compatriot's Karen Anderson and Marjorie Larney.

She was also the national champion in this event in 1951.

Born in Ridgefield Park, New Jersey, she married John E. Wood and had four children (Suzanne, Barron (Keith), Brendan, Sean and Terence). She died in Mattituck, New York.

International competitions

National titles
USA Outdoor Track and Field Championships
Shot put: 1949, 1950 (best American), 1951, 1952, 1953
Javelin throw: 1950, 1953
Discus throw: 1950 (best American)
Baseball throw: 1951
USA Indoor Track and Field Championships
Shot put: 1950, 1952, 1953

References

1930 births
2013 deaths
People from Ridgefield Park, New Jersey
Sportspeople from Bergen County, New Jersey
Track and field athletes from New Jersey
American female shot putters
American female javelin throwers
American female discus throwers
Pan American Games gold medalists for the United States
Pan American Games bronze medalists for the United States
Pan American Games medalists in athletics (track and field)
Athletes (track and field) at the 1951 Pan American Games
Athletes (track and field) at the 1955 Pan American Games
Athletes (track and field) at the 1959 Pan American Games
World record setters in athletics (track and field)
Olympic track and field athletes of the United States
Athletes (track and field) at the 1956 Summer Olympics
Medalists at the 1959 Pan American Games
21st-century American women